Events happening during the year 1874 in the Russian empire.

Incumbents
 Monarch – Alexander II

Events

 
 
  
  
 Jujevan
 Kiev Roshen Factory
 Odessa Russian Theatre

Births
 January 28 – Vsevolod Meyerhold, Russian theatre practitioner (d. 1940)
 February 7 – Nikifor Begichev, Soviet seaman and explorer (d. 1927)
 February 26 – Nikolai Korotkov, Russian surgeon (d. 1920)
 May 17 – Mikhail Diterikhs, Russian general (d. 1937)
 July 26 – Serge Koussevitzky, Russian conductor (d. 1951)
 October 9 – Nicholas Roerich, Russian painter (d. 1947)
 December 13 – Josef Lhévinne, Russian pianist (d. 1944)

Deaths

References

1874 in Russia
Years of the 19th century in the Russian Empire